Waterton Biosphere Reserve (established 1979) is a UNESCO Biosphere Reserve encompassing Waterton Lakes National Park in the extreme south-west of the Province of Alberta, Canada. The reserve includes a section of the east slopes of the Rocky Mountains extending from the Continental Divide to the edge of the Canadian Great Plains to the east. The Glacier Biosphere Reserve and National Park in Montana, USA is located to the south of the area. The reserve is administered by Waterton Lakes National Park and the Waterton Biosphere Association.

Ecological characteristics   

The steep environmental gradients from the Continental Divide to the prairies have created an unusually rich mosaic of habitats with their associated flora and fauna.

The biosphere reserve covers prairie grasslands, aspen grove forests, subalpine forests, alpine tundra and meadows, cliffs, lakes and freshwater wetlands as well as disturbed, heavily grazed land in the prairies.

Prairie grasslands including Danthonia spp., Festuca scabrella and prairie Junegrass; aspen grove forests with quaking aspen (Populus tremuloides), Amelanchier alnifolia and cow parsnip {Heracleum latanum); alpine tundra/high meadows characterized by Douglas fir (Pseudotsuga menziesii), lodgepole pine (Pinus contorta), limber pine (P. flexilis) and white barkpine (P. albicaulis); arctic-alpine communities above the tree line dominated by Dryas octopetala and Polemonium viscosum; upper subalpine forests with alpine larch (Larix lyallii), Luzula hitchcockii, Engelmann spruce (Picea engelmannii) and subalpine fir  (Abies lasiocarpa); lower subalpine forests dominated by Engelmann spruce and subalpine fir; deciduous forest, coniferous forests dominated by Douglas fir and limber pine; cliffs, lakes and freshwater wetlands; disturbed, heavily grazed land with quaking aspen, Urtica dioica, Bromus inermis and Phleum pratense.

Socio-economic characteristics 

, Waterton had a permanent population of 279 people and a seasonal population of about 2,250 during the peak summer season. Major source of income is tourism which mainly takes place in the buffer zone. Agriculture, especially livestock raising and sustainable forest use within the Blood Indian Reserve, is of importance mainly in the transition zone.

The biosphere reserve organizes or helps co-sponsor public seminars or forums on matters that attract local community interest or concerns and also arranges outings for students.

Area 

See also 
 Biosphere Reserves of Canada

Sources

References 

Biosphere reserves of Canada
Protected areas of Alberta
Blackfoot Confederacy
Southern Alberta
Protected areas of the Rocky Mountains
1979 establishments in Alberta